Paka pri Velenju is a settlement in the Municipality of Velenje in northern Slovenia. The area is part of the traditional region of Styria. The entire municipality is now included in the Savinja Statistical Region.

Name
The name of the settlement was changed from Paka to Paka pri Velenju in 1955.

References

External links
Paka pri Velenju at Geopedia

Populated places in the City Municipality of Velenje